Tadeusz Wiktor Kopeć (born 24 August 1960 in Pierściec, Cieszyn Silesia) is a Polish politician. He was elected to the Sejm on 25 September 2005, getting 6,206 votes in 27 Bielsko-Biała district as a candidate from the Civic Platform list.

In 2011 he won his race for senator in the number 79 Senate constituency, with 48,948 votes. On 22 May 2015 he resigned from membership in the Civic Platform and associated himself with Poland Together.

In the same year he won reelection to the Senate (this time starting from the list of Law and Justice) with 58,482 votes. In 2019 he was again reelected, with 78,655 votes.

See also
Members of Polish Sejm 2005-2007

External links
Tadeusz Kopeć - parliamentary page - includes declarations of interest, voting record, and transcripts of speeches.

References 

Members of the Polish Sejm 2005–2007
Members of the Polish Sejm 2007–2011
Members of the Senate of Poland 2011–2015
Members of the Senate of Poland 2015–2019
Members of the Senate of Poland 2019–2023
Civic Platform politicians
1960 births
Living people
People from Cieszyn Silesia
People from Cieszyn County